CITIC Offshore Helicopter Co., Ltd. is a China-based company that engages in offshore helicopter oil, general aviation transportation and aviation maintenance services. It is a part of CITIC Group.

CITIC Offshore Helicopter operates its businesses primarily in Shenzhen and Zhanjiang (Guangdong Province), Shanghai, Tianjin, Beijing, China.

As of 2008, CITIC Offshore Helicopter conducted 22,834 flights, logged 19,271.4 flight hours, transported 210,198 passengers and approximately 2.36 million kilograms of cargo.

Fleet

CITIC OH operates:

 8 Eurocopter EC 155B1
 9 EC 225LP
 10 AS 332L2 Mark 2
 2 AS 365B2
 2 EC135
 Dassault Falcon 2000 EX and 7X
 H410 - operated for China Maritime Safety Administration
 Z11
 A109E 
 A109S  - operated for China Maritime Safety Administration
 Ka-32A
 1 Sikorsky S-92

References

External links
 CITIC Offshore Helicopter (Chinese)

CITIC Group